Crown and Treaty is an album by English band Sweet Billy Pilgrim.  It is the follow up album to Twice Born Men, a Mercury Music Prize album of the year 2009.

Reception

Crown and Treaty received positive reviews upon release. On Metacritic, the album holds a score of 88/100 based on 8 reviews, indicating "universal acclaim."

Track listing
 "Joyful Reunion"
 "Archaeology"
 "Blakefield Gold"
 "Arrived at Upside Down"
 "Blood Is Big Expense"
 "Brugada"
 "Kracklite"
 "Shadow Captain"
 "Blue Sky Falls"

Personnel
Anthony Bishop – bass
Jana Carpenter – vocals
Alistair Hamer – drums
Tim Elsenburg – vocals, guitar, producer, mixing

References 

2012 albums
Sweet Billy Pilgrim albums